Jasleen Kaur Royal, known professionally as Jasleen Royal, is an Indian singer, songwriter and composer who sings in Punjabi, Hindi, Bengali, Gujarati as well as in English. She has received many awards and nominations including a Filmfare Award. In 2022, she became the first female music director in history to win the Filmfare Award for Best Music Director for the film Shershaah (2021) and shared the award with the four other composers who were involved in the film.

She won an award for the Best Indie Song at the MTV Video Music Awards India 2013. She received this award for her debut song "Panchi Ho Jaava", composed and sung by Jasleen which is based on a poem by late Shiv Kumar Batalvi.

She won an award for the "Best Indie Artist" at "Free The Music" an initiative by Songdew especially for Indie musicians. She was nominated alongside established and renowned singers like Kailash Kher, Rabbi Shergill and a Delhi-based band Indus Creed.

She entered Bollywood in September 2014 with Sonam Kapoor and Fawad Khan starrer film Khoobsurat with a song titled "Preet" which was composed by Sneha Khanwalkar and penned by Amitabh Verma.

Koi mane prem sikhvado (gujrati film)  gajab thai gayo | co singer (aditya gadhvi)

Early life and background
Kaur completed her schooling from Sacred Heart Convent School, Ludhiana and later moved to New Delhi for further studies. She completed her B. Com Honors from Hindu College, New Delhi.

With no formal training in music, majorly self-taught, Jasleen first gained popularity when she qualified as one of the semi finalists in the first season of India's Got Talent in 2009. She was all of 18 years of age at that time. She stood out because of her ability to play multiple instruments at the same time. She was amicably called as the 'one woman band' by the then judges Sonali Bendre, Kirron Kher and Shekhar Kapur for she can collectively play the guitar, mouth organ, flute and a tambourine while singing. She can also play the keyboard, which also happens to be the first instrument she ever played.
She currently resides in Mumbai and is working on multiple Bollywood projects.

Songs

Special appearances
Jasleen has performed on NDTV Our Girls, Our Pride along with Swanand Kirkire hosted by Priyanka Chopra.

She had also appeared and performed at L'Oréal Paris Miss Femina (India) Awards, 2014.

Jasleen has also participated in a debate on NDTV India on 'How money is not the bigger factor while choosing an employment'.

Awards

References

Indian women singer-songwriters
Indian singer-songwriters
Musicians from Ludhiana
1996 births
Living people
Hindu College, Delhi alumni
Singers from Punjab, India
Women musicians from Punjab, India
21st-century Indian women singers
21st-century Indian singers